The East Asian Games Dome is an indoor sporting arena located in Cotai, Macau, China.

Description
The venue was one of the major venues of the 2005 East Asian Games and also hosted some events for the 2007 Asian Indoor Games.

The Macau East Asian Games Dome  is the largest indoor sporting facility in the city. It comprises a three-story multi-purpose sporting complex covering a total area of 45,000 m2 with two separate functional indoor pavilions, which is ideal for different types of indoor sports and activities. It also consists of a large exhibition hall that can accommodate up to 2,000 people.

Pavilion 1:
With a total seating capacity of almost 7,000, one of this pavilion's main features is the dedicated indoor track and field set-up, which is ideal for different activities ranging from ceremonies to sporting events.

Pavilion 2:
This pavilion can seat up to 2,000 and is designed with a central stage that offers a U-shaped seat setting. This allows audiences to have a perfect view of the stage, especially suitable for exhibition sports such as dance sport.

History
The venue was officially opened in 2005.  Its first stone was laid by the chief executive of Macau, Edmund Ho, on February 28, 2003.

See also
 Sport in Macau

References 

Indoor arenas in Macau
Sports venues in Macau
Sports venues completed in 2005
2005 establishments in Macau
Esports venues in China